Justin Di Lollo is an Australian lobbyist. He is responsible for establishing a Sydney office of the firm Hakluyt and Company.

Early career 
Prior to lobbying Di Lollo was a political staffer. He advised multiple MPs within the ALP caucus between 1988 and 1999. He was a staffer to Kim Beazley between 1994 and 1999, while the MP was Minister for Finance, Deputy Prime Minister, and Leader of the Opposition.

Lobbying career 
After finishing work as a political staffer Di Lollo worked as a lobbyist for Hawker Britton, eventually becoming a managing director in 2010. His lobbying role included advocacy on behalf of banking, and coal seam gas interests.

He has been quoted multiple times by news media, particularly in relation to matters of politics, government, and the lobbying industry; but also on other topics. Many of these quotes were provided while Di Lollo was employed as a lobbyist on behalf of industry clients. He has spoken at a variety of industry conferences.

STW Group/WPP AUNZ 

Di Lollo was the practice director of government-relations firms for the STW Group (ASX:SGN) which was a part-owner of multiple government-relations and public-affairs firms in Australia, New Zealand and south-east Asia.

In 2016 STW Group merged with the Australian and New Zealand businesses of WPP plc following shareholder approval. Di Lollo was Executive Director of WPP AUNZ Government Relations with management over Hawker Britton and Barton Deakin.

Other activities 
Di Lollo is a Member of the Council of Governors of the American Chamber of Commerce in Australia.

See also 
 Hawker Britton

References

External links 
 STW Group

Australian political consultants
Australian lobbyists
Australian political writers
Living people
Year of birth missing (living people)